Mamoudzou (Momojou) is the capital of  Mayotte, a French overseas region and department in the Indian Ocean. Mamoudzou is the most populated commune (municipality) of Mayotte. It is located on Grande-Terre (or Maoré), the main island of Mayotte.

The commune is composed of 6 villages in addition to Mamoudzou. These are: Kawéni, Mtsapéré, Passamainti, Vahibé, Tsoundzou I and Tsoundzou II. The commune is also subdivided into 3 cantons: Mamoudzou-1, Mamoudzou-2 and Mamoudzou-3.

The government owns the radio station in Mamoudzou and broadcasts in French and Mahorian. The government departments are all situated in the town.

History
The former capital of Mayotte was Dzaoudzi, on the small island of Petite-Terre (or Pamanzi), but Mamoudzou was chosen as the capital in 1977. In the 1985 census, 12,026 people were recorded in the main town.

There have been environment concerns about marine pollution in the area; "important degradation in the quality of the coastal waters" between 1977 and 2007 has been reported in the Coral Reef Lagoon in the Mamoudzou–Dzaoudzi strait, and in the Mamoudzou–Majikavo conurbation.

Climate
Mamoudzou has a tropical savanna climate (Köppen climate classification Aw).

Administration

The commune is composed of 6 villages in addition to its central habitation, also called Mamoudzou. These are: Kawéni, Mtsapéré, Passamainti, Vahibé, Tsoundzou I and Tsoundzou II.

The commune is also subdivided into 3 cantons: Mamoudzou-1, Mamoudzou-2 and Mamoudzou-3.

The government owns the radio station in Mamoudzou and broadcasts in French and Mahorian. The government departments, including Agriculture and Forestry, Education, Health and Social Security, Public Works, Work, Employment and training and Youth and Sports are situated on the Rue Mariaze in the town. The government departments have been based in the town since before it became the capital, from World War II. France Télécom operates in the town.

Population

Economy

Mamoudzou has a bank and shopping centre. The economic centre of the town is the  Place du Marche, where the bank, Air France and Ewa Air offices, and the tourist office are located. The headquarters of the magazine Jana na Leo, "primarily concerned with articles on social life of the island of Mahore", is published in Mamoudzou. Noteworthy restaurants in Mamoudzou include the Les Terrasses, Hotel Restaurant Isijiva, Le Barfly and ''Mamoudzou La Kaz.

A ferry service is provided for tourists to the island of Petite Terre.

Notable people
 

Manou Mansour (born 1980), French poet

Religion

Churches
Our Lady of Fatima Church, Mamoudzou

References

External links

Official website 

 
Capitals in Africa
Populated places in Mayotte
Communes of Mayotte
Prefectures in France